Kevin Jorge Ramos Sousa (born 6 June 1994) is a Cape Verdean footballer who plays as a goalkeeper.

Career 
On 19 November 2014, Ken made his international debut against Zambia. He was included in the national squad for 2015 Africa Cup of Nations.

References

External links 
 
 
 

1994 births
Living people
Association football goalkeepers
Cape Verdean footballers
A.C. Alcanenense players
C.D. Nacional players
Académica do Mindelo players
Batuque FC players
Cape Verde international footballers
2015 Africa Cup of Nations players
Sportspeople from Praia